Ice Cream for Breakfast Day is an informal holiday celebrated on the first Saturday in February when some people deliberately eat ice cream for breakfast.

History 

The holiday was invented on a snowy winter day in the 1960s by Florence Rappaport in Rochester, New York, the mother of six children. It was her youngest two, Ruth (now Kristal) and Joe Rappaport, who inspired her on a cold and snowy February morning. To entertain them, she declared it to be Ice Cream For Breakfast Day. She explained, "It was cold and snowy and the kids were complaining that it was too cold to do anything. So I just said, 'Let's have ice cream for breakfast.'"  The next year, they reminded her of the day and a tradition began. The exact year of the first ICFBD is unrecorded, but it is speculated to be 1966, when a huge blizzard hit Rochester in late January, dumping several feet of snow on Rochester and shutting down schools. When the siblings grew up, they held parties and introduced the tradition to friends while in college, and the tradition began to spread.

Global spread
The holiday began to spread across the world thanks to Rappaport's grandchildren, who have traveled extensively. Celebrations have been recorded in Nepal, Namibia, Germany, New Zealand, Chile, and Honduras.   Some are small family celebrations and others are larger parties. The holiday has even been celebrated in China since 2003 and was featured in the Chinese edition of Cosmopolitan magazine and local magazines in Hangzhou, China.  

Ice Cream for Breakfast Day enjoys particular popularity in Israel. Israel's Haaretz newspaper first reported on ICFBD in 2013 in Hebrew  and then in 2014 in English.  In 2020, The Jerusalem Post newspaper reported that some 100,000 people in Israel were expected to mark the celebration.

How people celebrate 

Ice Cream For Breakfast Day is officially celebrated on the first Saturday of February. The holiday is often explained very simply: 
 Eat ice cream.
 On the first Saturday in February.
 For breakfast.

Charity events 

In recent years, several ice cream shops around the United States have started to use Ice Cream for Breakfast Day to raise money for charities (and to attract some cold weather customers).

References 

Ice cream
Unofficial observances
February observances
Rochester, New York
International observances
Observances about food and drink